Mario Edgio Pantaleone Fabrizi (1924 – 5 April 1963) was an English comedian and actor of Italian descent, noted for his luxuriant moustache. He was active in Britain in the 1950s and early 1960s.

Life
Fabrizi was born to Italian parents in Holborn, London, England, in 1924, his mother's maiden name being Pisani.  His father was a Vicomte (Italian: visconte), a title that Mario inherited on his father's death in 1959.  He married Katherine Boyne of Leeds on 28 May 1960.  They had a son, Anthony, in 1961.

On 5 April 1963 Fabrizi died of a stress-related illness at his home in Neasden, London; his wife and son survived him. A week before his death, he had announced that he was leaving show business.

His son Anthony is now a businessman based in the City of London.

Career
On ITV, Fabrizi was well known for his role in Granada Television's popular series The Army Game, as Corporal "Moosh" Merryweather, while on BBC television, he was a regular member of the ensemble cast of the Tony Hancock sitcom Hancock's Half Hour. His most notable film role was as Neville Shanks, the photographer, in Hancock's 1963 film, The Punch and Judy Man. He also worked frequently with Peter Sellers and Spike Milligan.

Selected filmography
 The Smallest Show on Earth (1957) - Actor in 'The Mystery of Hell Valley' (uncredited)
 The Naked Truth (1957) - Man in Autograph Crowd (uncredited)
 Carlton-Browne of the F.O. (1959) - Deputy Minister (uncredited)
 The Running Jumping & Standing Still Film (1960) - (uncredited)
 Two-Way Stretch (1960) - Jones
 The Rebel (1961) - Coffee Bar attendant
 Postman's Knock (1962) - Villager
 Operation Snatch (1962) - Tall Man
 Village of Daughters (1962) - Antonio Durigo
 It's Trad, Dad! (1962) - Spaghetti Eater
 Carry On Cruising (1962) - Second Cook
 On the Beat (1962) - Newspaper Seller
 Just for Fun (1963) - Diner
 The Wrong Arm of the Law (1963) - Van Driver (uncredited)
 The Punch and Judy Man (1963) - Nevil Shanks
 The Mouse on the Moon (1963) - Mario - the Valet
 The Pink Panther (1963) - Hotel Manager (uncredited) (final film role)

References

External links
 Getty Images Mario Fabrizi and Katherine Boyne just married
 
 Fabrizi bio from Tony Hancock online

English male comedians
English male film actors
English male television actors
1924 births
1963 deaths
People from Holborn
People from Neasden
British people of Italian descent
20th-century English male actors
20th-century English comedians